James Blake was the defending champion, but chose not to participate that year.

Marin Čilić won in the final 6–4, 4–6, 6–2, against Mardy Fish.

Seeds
All seeds receive a bye into the second round.

Draw

Finals

Top half

Section 1

Section 2

Bottom half

Section 3

Section 4

External links
Association of Tennis Professionals (ATP) draw
Association of Tennis Professionals (ATP) qualifying draw

Men's Singles